The 2009 World Port Tournament is an international baseball competition held at the DOOR Neptunus Familiestadion in Rotterdam, The Netherlands from July 2–12, 2009. It was the 12th edition of the tournament and featured teams from Chinese Taipei, Cuba, Japan and the Netherlands.

Originally, USA Baseball would send an All-Star team from the Great South League, but due to missing papers, the team had to withdraw from the tournament, one day before starting. The organization of the tournament decided that the four teams would meet each other a third time in the tournament.

Group stage

Standings

 Game 10 was postponed due to rain to Thursday morning, right before Game 13. Due to this double game, it was rule out to continue after the end of the 9th inning. It was the first time ever since 1989, that a full game ended in a tie.
 Chinese Taipei is the official IBAF designation for the team representing the state officially referred to as the Republic of China, more commonly known as Taiwan. (See also political status of Taiwan for details.)

Game results

 Game 10, was originally scheduled on July 7, 2009 on 19:00 UTC+1. Due to rain the game was postponed to July 9, 2009.

Championship game

Tournament awards and statistics

References

External links
Official Website
News updates from the 2009 World Port Tournament 

World Port Tournament
World Port Tournament
2009 in Dutch sport